Renato Kayzer de Souza (born 17 February 1996), known as Renato Kayzer, is a Brazilian footballer who plays as a forward for Fortaleza, por empréstimo de Daejeon Citizen.

Club career

Vasco da Gama
Born in Jotaesse, Tupãssi, Paraná, Kayzer moved to São Vicente, São Paulo at early age and started his career with Santos' youth setup. He subsequently represented Desportivo Brasil and Vasco da Gama, finishing his formation with the latter in 2015.

Kayzer made his first team – and Série A – debut for Vasco on 16 September 2015, coming on as a second-half substitute for Serginho in a 2–2 away draw against Cruzeiro. He only appeared in two further matches during the campaign, both as a substitute.

On 26 February 2016, Kayzer was loaned to Oeste until the end of the year. On 24 May, after featuring rarely, he moved to Série C side Portuguesa also in a temporary deal, but again featured sparingly.

Kayzer subsequently represented Villa Nova, Ferroviária and Tupi on loan, impressing with the latter in the 2018 Campeonato Mineiro.

Cruzeiro
On 9 April 2018, Kayzer signed for Cruzeiro and was immediately loaned to Atlético Goianiense in the Série B. He was a regular starter for the side, scoring seven goals and narrowly missing out promotion.

Kayzer returned to Raposa for the 2019 season; initially assigned to the first team, he was rarely used and subsequently moved out on loan to Ponte Preta. A subsequent loan move to Chapecoense followed, where he featured sparingly as the club suffered relegation.

On 29 December 2019, Kayzer returned to Atlético Goianiense, also on loan, with the side now in the top tier.

Athletico Paranaense
On 25 September 2020, Kayzer joined Athletico Paranaense on a permanent deal after a long series of loan spells.

Fortaleza
On 8 February 2022, Kayzer signed for Fortaleza on a permanent deal.

Daejeon Hana Citizen 
On 17 July 2022, Kayzer signed for Daejeon Hana Citizen on a 6-month loan deal.

= return to the Fortaleza 
O Renato Kayzer rescindiu seu contrato com o Daejeon Citizen e acabou o seu empréstimo com ele agora ele tem contrato com o Fortaleza até 2025

Career statistics

Honours
Fortaleza
Copa do Nordeste: 2022
Campeonato Cearense: 2022

References

External links

1996 births
Living people
Sportspeople from Paraná (state)
Brazilian footballers
Association football forwards
Campeonato Brasileiro Série A players
Campeonato Brasileiro Série B players
Campeonato Brasileiro Série C players
K League 2 players
CR Vasco da Gama players
Oeste Futebol Clube players
Associação Portuguesa de Desportos players
Villa Nova Atlético Clube players
Associação Ferroviária de Esportes players
Tupi Football Club players
Cruzeiro Esporte Clube players
Atlético Clube Goianiense players
Associação Atlética Ponte Preta players
Associação Chapecoense de Futebol players
Club Athletico Paranaense players
Fortaleza Esporte Clube players
Daejeon Hana Citizen FC players
Expatriate footballers in South Korea
Brazilian expatriate sportspeople in South Korea